Rudy K. Francisco (born July 27, 1982) is an American spoken word poet and author. He has won several Poetry Slams and written six books of poetry: Getting Stitches, Scratch, No Gravity, No Gravity Part II, Helium, and I'll Fly Away. He made an appearance on TV One's Verses and Flow and performed his spoken-word poem "Complainers" as well as "Rifle" on the Tonight Show Starring Jimmy Fallon.

Early life
Rudy Francisco was born and raised in San Diego, California and is of Belizean decent. He wrote a love poem as part of a writing assignment in his senior year of high school and received high marks for it. Rudy did not want to read this poem himself so his friend read it out loud for him instead. His teacher suggested he should keep up with his writing.

Francisco became more involved with spoken word as he watched HBO's Def Poetry. He also began to go to open mics in his area until they were closed due to gentrification. He then, with a group of local poets and activists called 'Collective Purpose,' opened an open mic known as Elevated in San Diego, which has been open for over ten years.

Rudy attended Alliant International University in San Diego. He went on to complete his Bachelor of Arts degree in psychology and pursue a master's degree in industrial and organizational psychology. Rudy was also an RA at his school and started hosting open mics. He got invited to other open mics and met other poets through them. As he became more involved with performing, he began to miss school a lot due to the demand of travel in order to perform. Rudy has said that it was a very hard decision for him to decide between school and poetry, but he was in love with poetry more than his program. He worked as a statistical analyst and completed three years of a Ph.D. program before quitting to do poetry full-time.

Poetry career
Rudy first got into performance poetry after going to many open mics and also after watching a show that featured the poet Shihan and fell in love with the style afterwards. He also says reading the book The Music Lesson by Victor Wooten was pivotal moment in his life as a poet. At first, Rudy has said that he thought that performing your poems was weird since you were being judged for your art. Now, he enjoys getting a score at the end of competition performances. He found that slam combines his two favorite things: writing and performing. Rudy has performed in many competitions, as well as shows all around the country and out of the states.

Rudy went on to write his debut poetry book Getting Stitches in 2013, Scratch in 2014, No Gravity in 2015, and his first full-length book Helium in 2017 which was published by Button Poetry. It took Rudy Francisco a year and a half to write the collection of 58 poems. Helium received positive reviews. When asked what Helium means in an interview, Francisco states that "helium allows you to defy gravity" and “in a lot of ways poetry always gave me that temporary escape.” Themes for Helium include: race, class, gender, love and self reflection. His style for his poems encompass "personal and political narratives through an honest and humorous approach." But Francisco says, "he is not finished yet, he is still learning."

Rudy Francisco is the founder and current coach of the San Diego Poetry Slam Team, which won the 2017 National Poetry Slam Championship.

Rudy Francisco performed his spoken-word poem "Complainers" on his first appearance on the Tonight Show Starring Jimmy Fallon on March 1, 2018. Rudy Francisco is the first to do a full length poem on the Tonight Show. Social media has contributed to the success of Francisco, he has said it is very important to him and he is unsure if he would be able to do his poetry career full-time without it. Many of his poems are on YouTube, some of which, like "Scars/To the New Boyfriend" have accumulated over a million views. He has also grown a large following on Instagram accounting for over 140,000 followers.

Personal life
Francisco described himself in an interview with Book Circle Online, as very competitive, explaining why he loves slam poetry so much. He has said he loves competition and performing. They help him improve and it brings out the best in him. Francisco also says that the slam community allows one be a part of a family, going on to say “some of my closest friends are people I have been on teams with or competed against. It is what keeps me coming back around.”

Francisco has a five-year-old daughter.

Tours and events
Francisco toured the UK in May and June 2018. In early June, Button Poetry announced on Facebook that performances scheduled for India with Sabrina Benaim were cancelled due to "scheduling and organizational issues." He also performed at the August 2018 slam poetry competition in Chicago representing the San Diego team again. Francisco went on tour in October in the UK with fellow poets Neil Hilborn and Sabrina Benaim. On April 30, 2019 he performed at Beltway Poetry Slam in Washington, D.C. He was also the host city coordinator for the May 13, 2019 Individual World Poetry Slam in Southern California. Francisco has said in future he hopes to rent out venues close to home in order to have his own shows.

Books of poetry
Getting Stitches (2013)
Scratch (2014)
No Gravity (2015)
Helium (2017)
I'll Fly Away (2020)

Filmography

Poetry awards
 2007 San Diego Grand Slam Champion
 2007 Poet of the People Slam Champion
 2008 Member of the Hollywood Poetry Slam Team
 2009 National Underground Poetry Individual Champion
 2009 3rd place in the Individual World Poetry Slam
 2010 La Poloma slam Champion
 2010 Chico Invitational Slam Champion
 2010 San Diego Grand Slam Champion 
 2010 San Francisco Grand Slam Champion
 2010 Member of the San Diego Poetry Slam Team (Regional Champion/6th ranked team in the nation)
 2010 Individual World Poetry Slam Slam Champion
 2017 National Poetry Slam Champion (as part of the San Diego Poetry Slam Team)

References

External links
Official website

Living people
21st-century American poets
American male poets
People from San Diego
21st-century American male writers
1982 births
African-American poets
Spoken word artists
21st-century African-American writers
20th-century African-American people
African-American male writers